Jane Air is a Russian rock band. The band was founded in 1999 in Saint Petersburg.

In 2002, Jane Air signed a contract with Kapkan Records and released their first record, Pull Ya? Let It Doll Go!.

From 2003 to 2007 the band opened concerts for Clawfinger, Therapy?, and Linkin Park.

After three years on Kapkan they released a second album, Jane Air. The first single was "Junk" (Jazz-funk) from this album was awarded "Song of the year" and received the prize Rock Alternative Music Prize from music channel A-One.

In 2006, their third album, Pere-Lachaise, was released. The fourth album, Sex and Violence, was released in 2007 on the label A-One Records.

Members

Discography

Albums

Singles

Music videos

References

External links

Fan-site
 

1999 establishments in Russia
Emo musical groups
Musical groups established in 1999
Musical groups from Saint Petersburg
Post-hardcore groups
Rap metal musical groups
Russian alternative rock groups
Russian alternative metal musical groups
Russian nu metal musical groups
Trip hop groups
YouTube channels launched in 2007